The 1990 Asian Games also known as the XI Asiad and the 11th Asian Games, were held from September 22 to October 7, 1990, in Beijing, China. This was the first Asian Games held in China.

Along the 1993 East Asian Games. This event served as a precursor to China's further development in the sporting arena, as before the country went on to bid for the 2000 Summer Olympics (losing to Sydney) in 1993 and eventually won the bid for the 2001 Summer Universiade in 1997 and the 2008 Summer Olympics in 2001 and the bid for the 2022 Winter Olympics in 2015. In a fact with precedent, China dominated the games, grabbing 60% of the gold medals and 34% of the total medal count.

This also marked Taiwan's first participation in the Asian Games as Chinese Taipei.

Bidding process
In 1983, Beijing and Hiroshima demonstrated interest in hosting the 1990 Asian Games. The two made formal presentations before the Olympic Council of Asia.  They were evaluated in a meeting of the council in Seoul during 1984, which also served to evaluate the preparations for the next Asian Games and also for the 1988 Summer Olympics.  
Beijing eventually won the right to host the 1990 edition, while Hiroshima, in a supreendent move presented an excellent technical bid, and won the rights to host of the 1994 Asian Games as compensation.

34 votes were needed for selection.

Stamps

To commemorate the 11th Asian Games, three different sets of stamps were issued in 1988, 1989 and 1990.

Mascot

The official mascot of this edition was PanPan, the panda.

Participating National Olympic Committees
National Olympic Committees (NOCs) are named according to their official IOC designations and arranged according to their official IOC country codes in 1990. Note that Iraq was suspended by the Olympic Council of Asia from participating at the Asian Games due to the Gulf War which killed first OCA president Fahad Al-Ahmed Al-Jaber Al-Sabah. Iraq would only return to compete in the sporting event in 2006.

Sports

Aquatics

Demonstration sports

Venues
The following venues were used during the Games. Yayuncun Subdistrict, the athlete's village was located in Chaoyang District and is now a residential area.

Medal table

The top ten ranked NOCs at these Games are listed below. The host nation, China, is highlighted.

References

 
A
Sports competitions in Beijing
Multi-sport events in China
Asian Games
Asian Games, 1990
Asian Games
Asian Games
Asian Games
Asian Games
Asian Games by year